Lawton–Fort Sill Regional Airport  is two miles south of Lawton, in Comanche County, Oklahoma. It is used for military aviation from nearby Fort Sill and Sheppard Air Force Base and is served by American Eagle. Allegiant Air runs occasional charters.

The National Plan of Integrated Airport Systems for 2011–2015 categorized it as a primary commercial service airport. Federal Aviation Administration records say the airport had 77,533 passenger boardings (enplanements) in calendar year 2008, 71,389 in 2009 and 68,054 in 2010.

.

Facilities
The airport covers 1,300 acres (526 ha) at an elevation of 1,110 feet (338 m). Its single runway, 17/35, is 8,599 by 150 feet (2,621 x 46 m) concrete.

In the year ending May 30, 2012 the airport had 33,983 aircraft operations, average 93 per day: 73% military, 18% general aviation, 8% air taxi, and 1% airline. 46 aircraft were then based at this airport: 93.5% single-engine and 6.5% multi-engine.

Airline and destination

Scheduled passenger service:

Continental Airlines flew to Lawton from 1948 until 1975, with DC-9s starting in 1967. Central Airlines served the city starting in 1953-54; successor Frontier Airlines served it until 1981.

Aircraft
Embraer ERJ-140s and Canadair CRJ-700s on American Eagle and general aviation.

References

External links
 
 Lawton–Fort Sill Regional Airport (LAW) at Oklahoma Aeronautics Commission
 Aerial image as of February 1995 from USGS The National Map
 
 
 

Airports in Oklahoma
Lawton, Oklahoma
Buildings and structures in Comanche County, Oklahoma